Seekogel is a mountain in the Lechtal Alps. 

Lechtal Alps